Jason Anthony Lowrie (born 22 January 1970) is a New Zealand rugby league coach and former player who represented New Zealand.

Background
He is the grand-nephew of fellow international Sam Lowrie.

Playing career
A Northcote Tigers junior, Lowrie in 1990 he represented the New Zealand Māori against Great Britain. He then played club football in Australia for the Sydney Roosters, Balmain and the Wests Tigers. Lowrie was a New Zealand international between 1993 and 2000 and played for New Zealand at the 1995 Rugby League World Cup. He also competed for Rest of the World during the Super League war. Lowrie was selected for the New Zealand team to compete in the end of season 1999 Rugby League Tri-Nations tournament. In the final against Australia he played from the interchange bench in the Kiwis' 22-20 loss.

Coaching career
Lowrie was co-coach of Harbour League in the Bartercard Cup alongside Ken McIntosh

In 2010 and 2011 Lowrie was the assistant coach for the Auckland Vulcans.

References

External links
World Cup 1995 details

1970 births
Living people
Auckland rugby league team players
Balmain Tigers players
Junior Kiwis players
New Zealand rugby league players
New Zealand Māori rugby league players
New Zealand Māori rugby league team players
New Zealand national rugby league team players
New Zealand rugby league coaches
Northcote Tigers players
Rugby league players from Auckland
Rugby league props
Sydney Roosters players
Wests Tigers players